Fenchol or 1,3,3-trimethyl-2-norbornanol is a monoterpenoid and an isomer of borneol. It is a colorless or white solid.  It occurs widely in nature.

The naturally occurring enantiomere (1R)-endo-(+)-fenchol is used extensively in perfumery. Fenchol gives basil its characteristic scent, and comprises 15.9% of the volatile oils of some species of Aster.

It is biosynthesized from geranyl pyrophosphate via isomerization to linalyl pyrophosphate.

Oxidation of fenchol gives fenchone.

References

External links
 3D-image

Secondary alcohols
Monoterpenes